Pandalam is a city in Pathanamthitta, Kerala

It may also refer to:
 Pandalam Bridge, a bridge situated in Pandalam junction
 Pandalam Bypass, a proposed road project in Pandalam
 Pandalam Suspension Bridge, a pedestrian suspension bridge in Pandalam
 Pandalam KSRTC Bus Station, a transport hub in Pandalam
 Pandalam Municipality, the civic body that governs Pandalam
 Pandalam dynasty, early dynasty in Kerala
 Pandalam Kerala Varma, Indian activist and poet
 Pandalam Sudhakaran, Indian politician
 Pandalam Palace, a royal palace in Kerala
 Pandalam Mahadeva Temple, a temple situated in Pandalam
 Pandalam Thekkekara, a village in Kerala